Kittridge is a surname. Notable people with the surname include:

 Bernard Kittridge, fictional character in The Passage novels
 Malachi Kittridge (1869–1928), American professional baseball player

See also
 Kittredge (name)